Phrudocentra kinstonensis is a moth of the  family Geometridae. It is found on Jamaica.

References

Moths described in 1878
Geometrinae